The second season of American Gods, based on Neil Gaiman's novel of the same name, was broadcast on Starz between March 10 and April 28, 2019, and consisted of eight episodes. Jesse Alexander adapted the second season, serving as the sole showrunner after Bryan Fuller and Michael Green departed the series, and production began in April 2018 after the season was officially greenlit in May 2017. The season stars Ricky Whittle, Emily Browning, Crispin Glover, Yetide Badaki, Bruce Langley, Pablo Schreiber and Ian McShane, who all return from the previous season, as well as Orlando Jones, Mousa Kraish, Omid Abtahi and Demore Barnes, who were promoted to series regular status for the second season.

The second season follows Shadow Moon, an ex-convict who is the right-hand man and bodyguard for Mr. Wednesday, an Old God who is in the midst of a war between the Old Gods, the gods from ancient mythology, and the New Gods, the gods of society, technology, and globalization.

Cast and characters

Main
 Ricky Whittle as Shadow Moon, a former convict who becomes Mr. Wednesday's bodyguard. Gabriel Darku portrays a young Shadow.
 Emily Browning as Laura Moon, Shadow Moon's wife and a revenant.
 Crispin Glover as Mr. World, the New God of globalization and the leader of the New Gods.
 Orlando Jones as Mr. Nancy, the Ghanaian trickster god Anansi. He works as a tailor.
 Yetide Badaki as Bilquis, a goddess of love, identified with the Queen of Sheba.
 Bruce Langley as the Technical Boy / Quantum Boy, the New God of technology.
 Mousa Kraish as the Jinn, a mythic being of fire who, fearing for his safety, considers fleeing the United States.
 Omid Abtahi as Salim, a foreigner who is "one half of a pair of star-crossed lovers".
 Demore Barnes as Mr. Ibis, the keeper of stories past and present, the Egyptian god Thoth.
 Pablo Schreiber as Mad Sweeney, a leprechaun in the employ of Mr. Wednesday who has trouble coming to terms with his lost charm.
 Ian McShane as Mr. Wednesday, a con artist and the god Odin.

Recurring
 Kahyun Kim as the New Goddess New Media, who is described as, "the goddess of global content and in this age, a cyberspace chameleon, who is also a master of manipulation".
 Peter Stormare as Czernobog, Slavic god of darkness, death and evil who suspects Mr. Wednesday's motives and is reluctant to lend his aid.
 Sakina Jaffrey as Mama-Ji, a waitress at the Motel America and the Hindu goddess of death and liberation, Kali. With her necklace of skulls, acerbic wit and free spirit, she is a match for any mighty god or man. She is present in each Motel America, which serve as meeting places for the gods.
 Andrew Koji as Mr. Xie, the top executive at the Silicon Valley company, Xie Comm. He invented the programs that write the electronic music that gave an increase in vitality, and brought more worshipers to, Technical Boy.

Guests
 Cloris Leachman as Zorya Vechernyaya, "the Evening Star", the eldest of three sisters who watch the stars to guard against forgotten horrors.
 Dean Winters as Mr. Town, a brutal and efficient agent tasked by the New Gods to find out what Shadow knows about Mr. Wednesday's plan.
 Devery Jacobs as Sam Black Crow, a fierce and confident college student, who travels alone in her dusty pickup truck, giving rides to hitchhikers whom she photographs. She is spiritually cynical for someone who claims to believe in so much.
 Christian Lloyd as Argus Panoptes, an all-seeing Greek giant who has many eyes that allow him to be asleep and awake at the same time. Over time he became the god of surveillance.
 Sana Asad as Bast, a goddess who lives as a cat at Ibis and Jacquel Funeral Parlor.
 William Sanderson as Bookkeeper, a representative of the god of Money.
 Mustafa Shakir as Baron Samedi, the Haitian loa of the dead who owns a bar in New Orleans.
 Hani Furstenberg as Maman Brigitte, Haitian loa of the dead and consort of Baron Samedi.
 Lee Arenberg as Alviss, the King of the Dwarves who is a builder and a forger.
 Jeremy Raymond as Dvalinn, the runemaster of the Dwarves. 
 Derek Theler as Donar Odinson, the son of Mr. Wednesday, and the Norse god of thunder, Thor.
 Laura Bell Bundy as Columbia, the female embodiment of Manifest destiny and the Spirit of America before the Statue of Liberty came and took her fame. Wednesday persuades her to promote the upcoming war.

Episodes

Production

Development
On May 10, 2017, the series was renewed for a second season. On November 29, 2017, it was announced that Fuller and Green were departing the show and were to be replaced as showrunners for season two after having completed writing roughly half of the season's scripts. On January 12, 2018, Starz President and CEO Chris Albrecht clarified the ongoing struggle with mounting a second season, including Gillian Anderson's and Kristin Chenoweth's involvement, Fuller and Green's continued involvement – stressing that they were never fired, nor did they quit – given their schedules, and showrunner and budget concerns, while stressing the difficulty of adaptation and the network and Fremantle Media's continued commitment to the series. On February 2, 2018, Jesse Alexander, writer for Fuller's Hannibal and Star Trek: Discovery, was announced as co-showrunner for the second season alongside Gaiman.

In September 2018, it was reported that Alexander had been removed as showrunner from the series by Starz and Fremantle. The series was also six weeks behind schedule and was forced to go on hiatus due to having an unfinished script for the season finale; Alexander submitted multiple drafts for the finale, but they were all rejected. Fuller and Green had scripted the first six episodes of season two, but they were thrown out once Alexander was hired to rewrite them. The season two episode order was trimmed from ten to eight episodes, similar to season one, in an attempt to trim the budget. The first season was $30 million over budget. Cast members were unhappy with the new scripts and they were often rewritten on set, including Ian McShane improvising dialogue. Starz was unhappy with Alexander's direction of the material, which was more "conventional", different from Fuller and Green's more "atmospheric, hypnotic" tone. With no showrunner, producing director Chris Byrne and line producer Lisa Kussner were left in charge.

Filming
Production began on the second season in April 2018, and with the season premiering on March 10, 2019.

Writing
During an interview with Neil Gaiman on June 24, 2016, he discussed plans for future seasons of the show beyond the first, should it be continued, and noting that the first season only covers the first third of the novel. The second season was intended to cover the Lakeside section of the novel, and "a big pivotal thing that happens to Mr. Wednesday" was likely to be a season finale for either the second or third season. However, the Lakeside arc was later pushed back to a potential third season.

Casting
On June 4, 2018, it was announced that Dean Winters, Devery Jacobs and Kahyun Kim would join the cast in the second season as Mr. Town, Sam Black Crow and Media; with the latter now known as New Media after the departure of Gillian Anderson in the role. It was also confirmed that Kristin Chenoweth would not be making an appearance in the season due to scheduling conflicts.

Reception

Critical response

The second season has received mixed reviews from critics. On Rotten Tomatoes, it has a 60% rating with an average score of 6.11 out of 10 based on 27 reviews with the consensus stating: "American Gods retains its bombastic style but loses its divine inspiration in a derivative second season that, after a change in show-runners and even some crucial cast members, feels like a false idol." On Metacritic, it has a score of 45 out of 100 based on 7 reviews, indicating "mixed or average reviews". Alan Sepinwall of Rolling Stone gave it 2 out of 5 stars, calling it "aimless" and despite having a "talented cast", Sepinwall ultimately felt "the whole thing is hollow and dull."

Ratings

References

External links
 
 

2019 American television seasons
American Gods (TV series)